Lars Urban Lennart Granberg (born 1965) is a Swedish social democratic politician, member of the Riksdag since 1994.

References

Members of the Riksdag from the Social Democrats
Living people
1965 births
Members of the Riksdag 2002–2006
Members of the Riksdag 2006–2010